The men's 10,000 metres event at the 2009 European Athletics U23 Championships was held in Kaunas, Lithuania, at S. Dariaus ir S. Girėno stadionas (Darius and Girėnas Stadium) on 18 July.

Medalists

Results

Final
18 July

Participation
According to an unofficial count, 18 athletes from 11 countries participated in the event.

 (3)
 (1)
 (1)
 (2)
 (1)
 (1)
 (1)
 (3)
 (1)
 (3)
 (1)

References

10000 metres
10,000 metres at the European Athletics U23 Championships